Sujay Krishna Rangarao is the former Minister of Mines in the cabinet of N. Chandrababu Naidu from 2014 to 2019, Andhra Pradesh, India.

Personal life 
Ranga Rao hails from the Bobbili Royal family who ruled Bobbili, in the present Vizianagaram district, Andhra Pradesh from 1652-1948 until the zamindaries were abolished. His grandfather Ramakrishna Ranga Rao of Bobbili was the chief-minister of Madras Presidency for two terms. His father Gopala Krishna Rangarao also served as Member of parliament, Lok Sabha in the 3rd Lok Sabha securing 1,35,315 votes against Kerri Narayana Rao from Cheepurupalli Loksabha constituency.

Political life 
Being the head of the Bobbili family and the titular Raja of Bobbili Estate, Sujay Krishna Ranga Rao is a three-time M.L.A. from Bobbili (Assembly constituency) from 2004 to 2009 (gaining 53,581 votes), 2009-2014 (securing 75,697 votes), 2014-2019 (securing 83,587 votes) and lost in the 2019 election.

See also 
Bobbili Estate
Bobbili Fort

References 

Telugu Desam Party politicians
Living people
Year of birth missing (living people)